Moula Ali hill also known as Maula Ali, had the ancient name  dome-shaped hill located in Moula Ali, Hyderabad, India. It is well known for the Moula Ali dargah and shia masjid, which are both on top of the hill. The area is maximally inhabited by Shia Muslims.

Overview

It has 484 steps from dargah to bottom of the hill and has about 600 tombs around it.

There is another hillock near the Moula Ali hill, called "Qadam -e- Rasul", on which the sacred relics of the prophet were deposited by Mohammad Shakrullah Rahan, a servant of Asaf Jahi.

History

The area near the hill has been inhabited by humans since Neolithic times. Excavations have found pottery, iron tools and fragments of human skeleton near the site.

In 1578, a eunuch of the Qutub Shahi court named Yakut was ill. He dreamt that a man in green dress told him to visit Moula Ali hill because Ali was waiting for him on top of the hill. In his dream Yakut went to the hill with the man and saw Ali sitting on top of the hill resting his hand on a stone. The next morning, Yaqut's illness was cured and a stone was found on the hill, which is said to have had the hand marks of Ali on it. After hearing about this incident, the Sultan visited the hill and ordered a dargah to be built on top of the hill. The stone that was found is kept in the shrine on top of the hill.

The hill was named 'Maula Ali', which means 'My Master Ali', after the incident. The stone became popular for sufis, ascetics and mystics because of the belief that the stone has healing powers.

Qutub shahi sultans began an annual pilgrimage on 17th Rijab to the hill from Golconda, but after sunni Muslims conquered Hyderabad in 1687, the festival temporarily stopped. In the Nizams rule, this festival became one of the two important national festivals.

Moula Ali dargah

The Moula Ali dargah is located on top of the hill. It was built by Sultan Ibrahim Qutub Shah and it is the only dargah dedicated to maula  Ali, son-in-law of Prophet Muhammad. Its interior is decorated with thousands of mirrors  and it is one of the 11 heritage sites in Hyderabad, identified by the "Heritage conservation committee" of HUDA. It is well known fact that Maula Ali Hill has engraving of the hand of Ali Ibn Talib, the fourth caliphate of Islam. It is revered by millions of people around the year.

References

Hills of Telangana
Geography of Hyderabad, India
Tourist attractions in Hyderabad, India